The Nepean Times was a weekly newspaper first published in the Australian city of Penrith, New South Wales on 3 March 1882.

History 
The Nepean Times was a weekly newspaper published by the Colless family in Penrith, New South Wales, Australia which ran from 1882 to 1962. Alfred Colless a local city councillor who ran a general store as well as a real estate and auctioneering business, established the paper. Initially published every Saturday the ‘popular independent organ for the people’ sold for threepence for most of its eighty years of existence and was the only local newspaper for most of its 80 years in publication. The newspaper was published every Saturday until 13 August 1936 when it changed to a Thursday publication day.

Up until the establishment of a locally produced newspaper in the Penrith district, Sydney and Parramatta newspapers, such as the Evening News, Cumberland Mercury and Sydney Morning Herald circulated in the local area and carried local news reports. The first newspaper published in Penrith was the short-lived Penrith Argus which commenced in 1881. Newspaper proprietor, William Webb, who was born in the district, had by the 1880s established a number of country papers. He set up his apprentice, a young William Shannon Walker as editor.

The Nepean Times was circulated from Rooty Hill (Blacktown) to Springwood (Blue Mountains), Castlereagh to Bringelly.

When the Nepean Times ceased publication after eighty years on 29 November 1962, it was not without a great deal of recognition of its lasting importance. It was the only newspaper owned, printed & published in Penrith at the time.

Awards 
In 1952, the high standards set by the Nepean Times newspaper was recognised when it was awarded the W.O. Richards Trophy by the NSW Country Press Association for the best weekly newspaper in New South Wales.

Conservation 
The Nepean Times original hardcopy is bound and kept within Penrith City Library. A microfilm copy has been produced for public access both at Penrith Library and the State Library of NSW.

The original Nepean Times "Wharfedale printing press" is conserved by the Penrith Museum of Printing.

Digitisation 
The issues of this paper from  1914 – 1920 have been digitised as part of the Australian Newspapers Digitisation Program project of the National Library of Australia.

See also 

 Cumberland Argus (Parramatta, covering Parramatta and surrounding districts – 1950–1962)
 The Cumberland Argus and Fruitgrowers' Advocate (Parramatta, covering Greater Western Sydney – 1887–1950)
List of newspapers in Australia
List of newspapers in New South Wales

References 

 Death of Mr Alfred Colless – Nepean Times, 1 January 1921, page 3, column 3–5
 The Nepean Times – hardcopy & microfilm
 "Penrith: The Makings of a City" by Lorraine Stacker (2014)

External links 
 
 Nepean Times newspaper – 1882–1962
 Penrith City Library Web Catalogue
 Press timeline: Select chronology of significant Australian press events to 2011
 The birth of the newspaper in Australia
 Isaacs, Victor, Kirkpatrick, Rod and Russell, John (2004). Australian Newspaper History: A Bibliography
 Isaacs, Victor; Kirkpatrick, Rod, Two hundred years of Sydney newspapers: A short history, Rural Press Ltd.

Defunct newspapers published in New South Wales
Publications established in 1882